Thelma Kingsbury (1911–1979), (later, in succession: Thelma Scovil, Thelma Welcome, Thelma Lougheed) was an English-born, naturalised American sportswoman who won major badminton titles in the British Isles and then in the US from the early 1930s to the early 1950s.

Badminton career
Equally adept in singles and doubles she won two women's singles titles and four women's doubles titles at the prestigious All-England Championships between 1933 and 1937.

In the 1935–1936 season, she achieved a British "Grand Slam" by winning the open singles titles of England, Ireland, Scotland, and Wales. After emigrating from Britain to the US, she won the U.S. women's singles title in 1941 and shared the U.S. women's doubles title with Janet Wright in 1941, 1947, 1948, 1949, and 1950. Though reaching 40 in the early 1950s, she continued to play highly competitive singles matches against such formidable opponents as Ethel Marshall, Margaret Varner, and a teenage Judy Devlin (Hashman). Thelma Kingsbury was among the initial class of players elected to the U.S. Badminton Hall of Fame in 1956.

Personal life
Her sister Leoni Kingsbury was also a leading badminton player.

References

English female badminton players
American female badminton players
1911 births
1979 deaths
20th-century American women
British emigrants to the United States